Collita digna is a moth of the family Erebidae. It is found in the Russian Far East.

The wingspan is about 36 mm for males and 47 mm for females. Males have grey forewings with dark grey scales at the base of the costal margin. The male hindwings are dark yellow. Females have paler forewings and dirty yellow hindwings.

References

Moths described in 2007
Lithosiina